Grove Collaborative is a benefit corporation headquartered in San Francisco. The company is an e-commerce retailer that sells natural household and personal care beauty products. 

Grove Collaborative makes and sells its own environmentally friendly home and personal care beauty products, as well as those of third-party companies.

History 
The company was founded in 2012 by CEO Stuart Landesberg under the name ePantry. In 2016, it was rebranded as Grove. 

In 2021, Grove Collaborative had pledged to be plastic-free by 2025. It partnered with Plastic Bank and rePurpose Global to collect and recycle ocean-bound plastic to offset its plastic footprint.

On April 18, 2021, Grove began a brick-and-mortar partnership with nationwide retailer Target Corporation, which carries some of its products.

In December 2021, Grove Collaborative merged with a special-purpose acquisition company backed by Sir Richard Branson’s Virgin Group. Unilever PLC’s CEO, Paul Polman has been named as a partner in the venture. Landesberg will continue to lead Grove. The merger includes taking the company public, which is valued at $1.5 billion. The combined company will be listed under “GROV” on the New York Stock Exchange.

As of the end of 2021, Grove raised $436 million in capital. In association with the December 2021 merger, $87 million would be raised in a private investment in public equity. The Virgin Group SPAC trust would provide an additional $348 million.

In July 2022, retailers Kohl’s, Meijer and Giant Eagle began carrying products from Grove Co.’s cleaning line. This brick-and-mortar retail partnership includes educational end cap displays to educate customers on reducing plastic waste.

Grove Collaborative officially went public June 17, 2022, on the New York Stock Exchange via its SPAC merger with Richard Branson’s Virgin Group Acquisition Corp.

2022 Q1 revenue declined by 11% compared to Q1 2021.

The company laid off 17% of its workforce not long after the Virgin SPAC merger to cut operating costs.

Grove Collaborative was chosen by Fast Company as one of their top innovative companies for 2022. 

In April of 2022, actress and entrepreneur Drew Barrymore became an investor in Grove Collaborative. She is the company’s first global brand and sustainability advocate. Barrymore will also work with the product development team to help the company achieve its goal of being plastic-free by 2025.

In February, former Burts Bees executive John Replogle was appointed chairman of Grove Collaborative’s board of directors.

In early 2022, Grove Collaborative named Sergio Cervantes as its new CFO. Cervantes spent 18 years with Unilever and four years with Gillette.

In 2021, Grove Collaborative hired former Amazon executive Jennie Perry to serve as its chief marketing officer.
Grove has offices in San Francisco, Portland, Maine, and Durham, North Carolina.

References 

2012 establishments in California
E-commerce in the United States